Majdaloun    is a village in the  Baalbek District in Baalbek-Hermel Governorate.

History
In 1838, Eli Smith noted  Mejdelun   as a village in the plain in the Baalbek area.

See also
Tell Majdaloun

References

Bibliography

External links
Majdaloun,  Localiban

Populated places in Baalbek District